Atto (died 971) was the bishop of Vic from 957 until his death. He had the bishopric of Vic raised to an archbishopric, but was assassinated by his opponents in 971.

Notes

References

971 deaths
Bishops of Vic
10th-century Catalan bishops
Year of birth missing